Money for Jam is an Australian lifestyle television series which airs on the Nine Network. It features Money magazine editor Effie Zahos and financial expert Paul Clitheroe as presenters, as well as Nine Network personalities Shelley Craft and Shane Crawford. The series' title is a reference to the colloquialism "money for jam", which is used to imply that 'money can be made easily'. The series has not been renewed for a second series in 2010.

Format
Money for Jam will present ideas on how to put more money back in your pocket. In episode one, Effie will show you how to get a bonus worth nearly $3000 a year. Shane meets a man who has turned his love of beer into a business. Five tradesmen take Shelley's lunchbox challenge. And there are words of wisdom from money-man Paul Clitheroe. Plus the "Super Scrooge of the Week" segment with the scroogiest ideas to save a buck.

Episodes

Notes

References

External links
 Official website

Nine Network original programming
2009 Australian television series debuts
2009 Australian television series endings
Australian factual television series